The 2007 Kogi State gubernatorial election was the 4th gubernatorial election of Kogi State. Held on April 14, 2007, the People's Democratic Party nominee Ibrahim Idris won the election, defeating Mohammed Abdulsalami Ohiare of the Action Congress of Nigeria.

Results 
A total of 16 candidates contested in the election. Ibrahim Idris from the People's Democratic Party won the election, defeating Mohammed Abdulsalami Ohiare from the Action Congress of Nigeria. Registered voters was 1,479,834.

References 

Kogi State gubernatorial elections
Kogi gubernatorial
April 2007 events in Nigeria